Gretsch is an American company that manufactures musical instruments. The company was founded in 1883 in Brooklyn, New York by Friedrich Gretsch, a 27-year-old German immigrant, shortly after his arrival to the United States. Friedrich Gretsch manufactured banjos, tambourines, and drums until his death in 1895. In 1916, his son, Fred Gretsch Sr. moved operations to a larger facility where Gretsch went on to become a  prominent manufacturer of American musical instruments. Through the years, Gretsch has manufactured a wide range of instruments, though they currently focus on electric, acoustic and resonator guitars, basses, ukuleles, and drums.

Gretsch instruments enjoyed market prominence by the 1950s. In 1954, Gretsch began a collaboration with guitarist Chet Atkins to manufacture a line of electric guitars with Atkins' endorsement, resulting in the Gretsch 6120 hollowbody guitar and other later models such as the Country Gentleman. Electric guitars before 1957 used single coil pickups that have significant hum problems as an inherent part of their design. Frustration with the hum of these pickups prompted Atkins to collaborate with American inventor and engineer Ray Butts on the development of a new "humbucking" pickup by connecting two single-coil pickups serially and out of phase. This resulted in what may have been the first humbucker pickup (a claim lost to Gibson Guitars because Gibson was able to file a patent for their humbucker design first). Butts' design became the Gretsch Filter'Tron and was used on Gretsch guitars beginning in 1957, and is highly regarded for its unique sound properties. The popularity of Gretsch guitars soared in the mid-1960s because of its association with Beatles guitarist George Harrison, who played Gretsch guitars beginning in the band's early years.

In 2002, Gretsch entered a business agreement with Fender Musical Instruments Corporation (FMIC). Under the terms of the agreement Fred W. Gretsch retains ownership while FMIC has the exclusive rights to develop, produce, market and distribute Gretsch guitars worldwide.

History

Beginnings

Gretsch was founded in 1883 by Friedrich Gretsch, a young German immigrant who opened his own musical instrument shop on 128 Middleton Street in Brooklyn, New York that year. His shop was designed for the manufacture of  tambourines and drums. The operation moved to South 4th Street in 1894. In 1895, Gretsch died at the age of 39 and the company was taken over by his wife and fifteen-year-old son Fred.

Fred Gretsch expanded the business, adding Gretsch Building #1 at 109 South 5th Street in 1903, Gretsch Building #2 at 104-114 South 4th Street in 1910, and a new ten-story Gretsch Building #4 at 60 Broadway in 1916. The company ultimately owned or operated six properties in the immediate area, including a warehouse on Dunham Place. Gretsch Building #4 was owned by the Gretsch family until 1999. Guitar production by the Gretsch Company began in the early 1930s, and Gretsch guitars became highly sought after, most notably in the 1950s and 1960s.

1950s, 1960s, 1970s

Fred Gretsch Sr. handed over the family business to his son, Fred Gretsch Jr., after retiring in 1942. Soon after taking over, Fred Jr. left to serve in WWII as a Navy commander, leaving the business in the hands of his younger brother, William Walter "Bill" Gretsch. Bill Gretsch died in 1948 and the company was again run by Fred Jr.

By the mid-1950s the company introduced several models, including the 6120 "Nashville," and the Duo Jet chambered "solid body", which was played by Bo Diddley. Two other models were introduced - the Country Club, and the White Falcon.

During this time, Chet Atkins became an endorser of Gretsch and they sold guitars with Atkins' name on the pickguard.

Sale to Baldwin, Gretsch family regains interest
Fred Gretsch never found a suitable successor, and in 1967 Gretsch was sold to Baldwin Pianos, becoming a subsidiary of that firm. Mid-1969, Baldwin moved Gretsch instrument manufacturing operations from Brooklyn to a plant in DeQueen, Arkansas.

In 1983, Baldwin's holding company and several of its subsidiaries were forced into bankruptcy. At the time it was the largest bankruptcy ever, with a total debt of over $9 billion. In 1984, former Baldwin CEO Richard Harrison bought the Baldwin music divisions and brought back former Gretsch employee, Duke Kramer, to run the Gretsch division.

In 1985, the Gretsch company once again came under the leadership of the Gretsch family when Fred W. Gretsch, great grandson of Friedrich and nephew of Fred Gretsch Jr, assumed presidency of the company. The first Gretsch guitars after Fred W Gretsch became president were released in 1988. They were a series of Traveling Wilburys commemorative guitars, which bore little resemblance to prior Gretsch models. In 1989, Gretsch restarted large-scale production of new guitars based on classic Gretsch models.

FMIC control
In late 2002, Gretsch and the Fender Musical Instruments Corporation reached an agreement giving Fender control over marketing, production, and distribution of guitars, with the Gretsch family retaining ownership of the company.

Guitars

Models
Gretsch 6075, 6076, "Gretsch 12-String" (Sunburst, Natural)
Gretsch 6104, 6105, Gretsch "Rally" (Cadillac/Rally Green, Bamboo Yellow/Copper).
Gretsch 6119, Chet Atkins "Tennessean"
Gretsch 6120
Gretsch 6122, Chet Atkins "Country Gentleman"
Gretsch 6123, Gretsch "Monkees Rock 'n' Roll Model"
Gretsch G1627 Synchromatic Sparkle Jet
Gretsch 6128 Duo Jet
Gretsch 6129 Silver Jet
Gretsch 6187, 6188, 6189, "Viking" (Sunburst, Natural, Cadillac Green)
Gretsch G6128, G6129, G6229 Players Edition Jet
Gretsch G6131 Jet Firebird
Gretsch G6131MY Signature Jet (Malcolm Young Edition)
Gretsch 6134 White Penguin
Gretsch 6136 White Falcon
Gretsch 6199 Jupiter Thunderbird
Gretsch G2420, G2622, and G2655 Streamliner
Gretsch G9201 Honey Dipper Resonator
Gretsch G9221 Bobtail Resonator
Gretsch G9500 Jim Dandy Flat Top Acoustic
Gretsch G9520E Gin Rickey Acoustic/Electric
Gretsch BST 1000
Gretsch Triple Jet

Notable players
1950s
Chet Atkins
Eddie Cochran
Duane Eddy
Cliff Gallup

1960s
Bo Diddley
Hank Garland
George Harrison
Brian Jones
John Lennon
Michael Nesmith
Lou Reed

1970s
Billy Gibbons
Mike Campbell
Elvis Presley
Pete Townshend
Neil Young

1980s
Matthew Ashman
Boz Boorer
Billy Duffy
Martin Gore
The Reverend Horton Heat
Poison Ivy
Johnny Marr
Brian Setzer
Robert Smith
John Squire
Malcolm Young
Billy Zoom
Manu Chao

1990s
Mark Arm
Jeff Beck
Bono
Chris Cheney
Chris Cornell
Jack White
PJ Harvey
John Frusciante

2000s
Billie Joe Armstrong
Richard Fortus
David Gilmour
Darrel Higham
G. Love
Nick 13
Patrick Stump

2010s
Tim Armstrong
 Dan Auerbach
Henri Cash
Ed O'Brien
Alex Turner

Drums

See also
 Sho-Bud – Brand of pedal steel guitars owned by Gretsch

Bibliography
 Bacon, T. (2005). (Ed.). 50 Years of Gretsch Electrics. Backbeat Books. San Francisco. .
 Bacon, T. (2000). (Ed.). Fuzz & Feedback: Classic Guitar Music of the 60's. Miller Freeman Books. San Francisco. .
 Bacon, T. (2015). The Gretsch Electric Guitar Book: 60 Years of White Falcons, 6120s, Jets, Gents, and More. Backbeat Books. Milwaukee. 
 Howe, Z. (2014). (Ed.). Barbed Wire Kisses: The Jesus and Mary Chain Story. Polygon. Edinburgh. .

References

External links

 
 Interview with Fred Gretsch - NAMM Oral History Library (2006)
 Interview with Dinah Gretsch - NAMM Oral History Library (2006)

Guitar manufacturing companies of the United States
Percussion instrument manufacturing companies
Manufacturing companies based in New York City
American companies established in 1883
Musical instrument manufacturing companies of the United States
Manufacturing companies established in 1883
Fender Musical Instruments Corporation